Javier Fuentes may refer to:

Javier Paniagua Fuentes, Spanish author and politician
Javier Fuentes-León, Peruvian film director